Ajorluy may refer to:
 Ajorluy-ye Gharbi Rural District
 Ajorluy-ye Sharqi Rural District